The Women's 5 km Open Water event at the 2010 South American Games was held on March 23 at 10:10.

Medalists

Results

References
Report

Open Water 5km W